Regina M. "Gina" Walsh (born April 23, 1957) is a Democratic Party member of the Missouri Senate, representing District 13 from 2013 to 2021. She served as interim Senate Minority Leader. Prior to her service in the State Senate, Walsh served four terms in the Missouri House of Representatives, representing North St. Louis County's 69th District, which included Bellefontaine Neighbors, Glasgow Village, Jennings, Moline Acres, and Riverview.

Electoral history

State Representative

State Senate

References

External links
Missouri Senate - Gina Walsh official MO Senate website
Project Vote Smart - Representative Gina Walsh profile
Follow the Money - Gina Walsh
Gina Walsh on STL.NEWS
 Gina Walsh campaign website
2006 campaign contributions 2004 campaign contributions 2002 campaign contributions

1957 births
21st-century American politicians
21st-century American women politicians
Living people
Democratic Party Missouri state senators
Politicians from St. Louis
Women state legislators in Missouri